Execution by firing squad is a method of capital punishment.

Firing squad may also refer to:

 Firing Squad (album), a 1996 album by M.O.P.
 Firing Squad (film) a 1990 Canadian television film based on the 1958 novel Execution
 The Firing Squad, a 1999 American film
 "Firing Squad", a 2015 song by Lifehouse from the album Out of the Wasteland

See also
 Firing squad synchronization problem, a problem in computer science first proposed in 1957